Dubyonki (Dubińka) is a rural locality (a selo) and the administrative center of Dubyonsky District of the Republic of Mordovia, Russia. Population:

References

Notes

Sources

Rural localities in Mordovia
Dubyonsky District, Republic of Mordovia
Alatyrsky Uyezd